Hello Motherfucker! is the 2001 re-issue of the CD EP Hello Motherfucker! EP by the band Milligram.
It consists of the Black & White Rainbow companion CD added to Hello Motherfucker! EP.

Hello Motherfucker! EP
Track listing

Black & White Rainbow
Track listing 

2001 albums
Milligram (band) albums